A constitutional referendum was held in Croatia on 1 December 2013. The proposed amendment to the constitution would define marriage as being a union between a man and a woman, which would create a constitutional prohibition against same-sex marriage. 37.9% of eligible voters voted. After processing all of the ballots, the State Election Commission announced that 65.87% voted yes, 33.51% no and 0.57% of ballots were disregarded as invalid.

The referendum was called after a conservative organization U ime obitelji (“On Behalf of the Family”) gathered more than 700,000 signatures in May 2013 demanding a referendum on the subject. The initiative was supported by conservative political parties, the Catholic Church as well as by several other faith groups. The ruling left-wing coalition opposed the amendment along with numerous human rights organizations.

Political background
A petition in favor of the change was organized by a Catholic citizens' group 'On Behalf of the Family' (U ime obitelji) and collected over 700,000 signatures by May 2013.  The initiative was a reaction to the government's proposal to legalize same-sex partnership. The referendum was approved following a vote in the Sabor on 8 November in which 104 of the 151 MPs voted in favor of holding a referendum.

The group Citizens Voting Against was formed from 88 civil society organizations (led GONG, Center for Peace Studies and Zagreb Pride), supported by numerous public persons, film actors and actresses, academics, activists and politicians, including media such as Novi list and Jutarnji list and musicians, such as Severina, Dubioza kolektiv, Let 3, Hladno pivo, TBF and others.

The Vote Against campaign claimed that the public faces of the initiative Željka Markić, Krešimir Planinić, Krešimir Miletić, Ladislav Ilčić, as well as members of their families, were simultaneously leaders of the referendum effort and candidates of the right wing political party HRAST. The Vote Against and the broader coalition of civil society organizations, Platform 112, claimed that the bank account listed on 'On behalf of the Family' web site does not belong to the initiative but an ad hoc registered association Građani odlučuju ("The citizens decide") which was founded by the vice-president of HRAST Krešimir Miletić.

Željka Markić was furthermore criticized by opponents for allegedly being a member of the controversial Catholic organization Opus Dei.

Constitutionality of the referendum question
Voters were asked the question:

After the initiative gathered enough signatures to hold a referendum, it was widely speculated that the referendum would still not be held. The political willingness in the Sabor to call a referendum was uncertain given that a left-wing coalition which opposed the proposed amendment held a majority of the seats.

However, in a session held on 8 November, the Sabor voted to call a national referendum, with 104 votes in favour, 13 against and five abstentions. A former Prime Minister and an independent MP Jadranka Kosor proposed that the request for the review of constitutionality of the referendum be submitted to the Constitutional Court. However, the two largest parties, the  HDZ and SDP, did not embrace the proposal and it was rejected by 75 votes against and 39 in favour. The only political party of the ruling coalition that supported the constitutional review was the HNS.

After a two-day session, on 14 November the Constitutional Court of Croatia announced that there is no reason to over-rule the parliamentary vote on the referendum. The judges emphasized that the constitutionality of the referendum itself was not considered, because they believed that the Sabor had expressed its legal willingness to deem the referendum question compliant with the Constitution. However, they further emphasized that any possible amendment to the Constitution that defined marriage as a union of man and woman could not affect further development of the legal framework of the institution of extramarital and same-sex unions. The Constitutional Court did not rule on the constitutionality of the referendum because it was not officially requested to do so by the Croatian Parliament.

The judges were divided in opinion on whether the Constitutional Court should review the constitutionality of the referendum. Several of them pointed out that the Constitutional Court must give a statement on what the constitutional definition of marriage means for the position of LGBT minorities in Croatia. Others explained that the Constitutional Court did not need to respond to citizen proposals, because only the Sabor had the right to request a review of the constitutionality of the referendum question, but which it has refused to do when making the decision to call a referendum.

Campaign
The Prime Minister Zoran Milanović told HRT that he would vote against the proposal. President Ivo Josipović called the referendum unnecessary, without practical political consequences regardless of the outcome, and a waste of taxpayer money. The president furthermore commented that marriage has already been defined in Croatian law as a union of man and woman, but that the referendum question has a strong psychological effect with an underlying discriminatory message.

Tomislav Karamarko, leader of the conservative Croatian Democratic Union said he would vote in favor. Four other parties in the Parliament also supported the referendum; in total 104 of 151 members of the Croatian Parliament supported it.

Jutarnji list, one of the country's two largest newspapers, announced it would openly endorse the campaign against the amendment. A similar statement was later made by Novi list.

The Croatian Bishops' Conference called for Croatian Catholics to vote in favour of the constitutional amendment. Representatives from the Croatian Bishops' Conference, the Serbian Orthodox Church, the Macedonian Orthodox Church, the Reformed Christian (Calvinist) Church, the Baptist Union of Croatia, the Evangelical Pentecostal Church, the Bet Israel Jewish Community and the Mesihat of Croatia issued a joint statement in support of the referendum on 12 November. However, the Croatian Evangelical Lutheran Church and the Jewish Community of Zagreb opposed the proposed amendment. The Rabbinical Center of Europe has written a statement in support of the referendum and the civil initiative 'On behalf of the family', saying they were "very  disturbed  at  reports  that  some  have  compared  this pro-marriage  initiative  with  the  Nazi  regime  and  the  ideology  of fascism".

Cardinal Josip Bozanić encouraged support for the amendment in a letter that was read in churches where he singled out heterosexual marriage as being the only kind of union that is capable of biologically producing children.

Bozanić repeatedly called the issue of marriage naming a serious issue for country's future and reiterated the viewpoint that it is not Church's intent to discriminate against anybody, but only to "preserve what we already have". He remarked that the referendum was an opportunity for Christians to practically manifest their fate by voting yes, by respecting God's intent and serving the Truth. He echoed his previous statements that marriage and family are not a private affair of the individual which they can shape as they see fit, but are of wider social significance and must not be experimented upon.

Media portrayal
The initiative and their goals were generally unfavorably reported by the mainstream Croatian media.

On the day of the referendum the initiative decided to forbid access to their headquarters to the journalists belonging to a group of selected media whom the initiative accused of bias, unprofessionalism and plagiarism. Among these were the Croatian Radiotelevision, the public broadcasting company, the most visited Croatian Internet portals Index.hr, Net.hr and T-portal, as well as all of the publications by Europapress Holding and Novi list. The initiative required of all of the journalists to submit their cell phone numbers, their home addresses, e-mail addresses as well as the name and e-mail address of their editors. This was strongly denounced by the Croatian Journalists' Association who invited all of the media to boycott the coverage of initiative on the referendum day, and emphasized the potential for the abuse of private information.

All of the major Croatia media have responded to the call and in solidarity with the banned journalists have completely boycotted the coverage of the initiative.

Opinion polls
A poll conducted in June 2013 revealed that 55.3% of Croats support the changes, while 31.1% said they were opposed.

Another poll from November revealed that 54.3% of respondents will vote for the proposal and 33.6% against. 12.1% of respondents said they were not sure. The same poll revealed that 85.7% of HDZ voters and 39.5% of SDP voters support the proposed amendment.

A poll published by HRT two days before the vote showed that 59% of respondents would vote for the proposal, 31% against and 10% did not answer.

Results
After processing all of the ballots, the State Election Commission announced that 65.87% voted yes, 33.51% no and 0.57% of ballots were disregarded as invalid. 37.9% of eligible voters have voted.

Pula, Rijeka, Varaždin and Čakovec were the only large cities, and Istria county and Primorje-Gorski Kotar County were the only counties where the majority of the voters voted no. The counties most supportive of changes were in the Croatian South: Šibenik-Knin, Split-Dalmatia, Dubrovnik-Neretva, and Brod-Posavina. This relative polarization of results between Croatian North and South has been interpreted by sociologists as closely connected to economic indicators as well as the extent to which the regions were affected by the war in the 1990s. In the capital Zagreb, 43.5% of voters voted no, which was interpreted as the capital being an amalgam of "largely incompatible tendencies".

Statistical analysis by electoral units has also indicated a strong correlation to political choices, with regions whose citizens voted for right-wing parties generally voting in favor of the referendum, while regions who voted for the left-wing coalition were largely against the referendum - albeit with many exceptions.

By county

Reactions

Negative reactions
The Prime Minister Zoran Milanović rejected accusations by civic initiatives that the government was complicit in calling the referendum. Milanović pointed out that the referendum was allowed by the constitution, that it is in no way related to the government, and no way does it change the existing definition of marriage according to Croatian laws. He further announced the upcoming enactment of the Law on Partnership, which will enable same-sex persons to form a lifetime partnership union. Such a union will share the same rights as that of marriage proper, apart from the fact that gay couples will not be able to adopt children, though they will be allowed to have custody of them.

Vesna Pusić, the First Deputy Prime Minister, also rejected accusations on government's responsibility, commenting that the referendum is result of an omission, when the threshold of 50 percent voter turnout was abolished to pass the 2012 EU membership referendum. Pusić contended that the threshold had protected certain groups from discrimination by a minority, but care was not taken to specifically exempt human, civil and minority rights from being the subject of referendum questions.

Hannes Swoboda, the President of the European Socialists, said that he "was deeply disappointed because he saw Croatia as an open and advanced society, and not as a country which prohibits happiness and equal rights".

Positive reactions
Hungary's ruling Christian Democratic People's Party (KDNP) welcomed the results, which cheered the approval of partnership based on "the order of nature" and the affirmation of marriage "in the Christian sense". According to the KDNP, it is the victory of the "European Christian values".

The Rabbinical Centre of Europe issued a statement that it was disturbed by comparisons between the initiative and the Nazi regime and totalitarian fascism, and that such statements were inappropriate and insulting to the memory of millions of their victims.

Croatian bishop Vlado Košić described the government official's opposition to the referendum as shocking, unacceptable and undemocratic, emphasizing that Croats are Catholic people, cherishing traditions by which they have lived for centuries. He accused the government of atheizing the population, being eager to erase their traditional values, and has called for their resignation.

See also
 Recognition of same-sex unions in Croatia
 LGBT rights in Croatia

References

External links
 Official results by State Election Committee (Interactive Map)

2013 in Croatia
Referendums in Croatia
2013 referendums
LGBT rights in Croatia
2013 in LGBT history
Same-sex marriage referendums
Opposition to same-sex marriage
Constitutional referendums
December 2013 events in Europe